Condes may refer to:

Places
 Condes, Jura, a commune in the French region of Franche-Comté
 Condes, Haute-Marne, a commune in the French region of Champagne-Ardenne

People with the surname
 Florante Condes (born 1980), Filipino boxer

See also 
 Las Condes, Chile